The Men's 4 × 200 metre freestyle relay competition of the 2018 FINA World Swimming Championships (25 m) was held on 14 December 2018.

Records
Prior to the competition, the existing world and championship records were as follows.

The following records were established during the competition:

Results

Heats
The heats were started on 14 December at 11:10.

Final
The final was held on 14 December at 20:52.

References

Men's 4 x 200 metre freestyle relay